Lewis Morris Rutherfurd Jr. (March 31, 1859 – January 5, 1901) was an American socialite and sportsman from New York known for breeding fox terrier dogs.

Early life
Rutherford was born on March 31, 1859, in New York City.  He was the second youngest son of seven children born to Lewis Morris Rutherfurd (1816–1892), a prominent astronomer, and Margaret Chanler Stuyvesant (1820–1890).  His elder siblings included Stuyvesant Rutherfurd (1843–1909), Louisa Morris Rutherfurd (1855–1892), Margaret Stuyvesant Rutherfurd (1853-1916), who was married to Henry White, and Winthrop Rutherfurd (1862–1944), best known for his romance with Consuelo Vanderbilt and his marriage to Lucy Mercer, mistress to President Franklin D. Roosevelt.

His paternal grandparents were Robert Walter Rutherfurd (1788–1852) and Sabina Morris (1789–1857) of Morrisania.  He was the great-grandson of U.S. Senator John Rutherfurd and 2x great-grandson of Lewis Morris, the Signer of the Declaration of Independence.  Rutherfurd was a direct descendant of Peter Stuyvesant, the last Dutch Director-General of New Netherland before it became New York, as well as John Winthrop, the first Governor of Massachusetts.  His mother was the niece and adopted daughter of Peter Gerard Stuyvesant (1778–1847), the 2x great-grandson of Peter Stuyvesant and Helena Rutherfurd Stuyvesant.  His mother's siblings included Elizabeth Winthrop Chanler (1824–1904) and John Winthrop Chanler (1826–1877).

He was a graduate of Columbia College in 1882.

Society life
Rutherfurd was a prominent social figure and known for his appreciation of sports, holding the championship of the Racquet Club for several years and widely known by automobilists.

He initiated the family's breeding of fox terrier dogs along with his brother Winthrop.  Together, they owned the famous Rutherfurd Kennels in Allamuchy, New Jersey.

Rutherfurd was a member of the Union Club of New York, since 1886, and often frequented the Knickerbocker Club.  He was a member of a "fraternity of young clubmen which a few years ago made as close knit a band as could be found of New York's representative good fellows" that included Woodbury Kane, Reginald Rives, Brockholst Cutting, William Cutting, William Travers (who married Rutherfurd's sister), and Winthrop Rutherfurd.

Personal life
On June 16, 1890, Rutherfurd was married to Anne Harriman Sands (1861–1940), the widow of Samuel Stevens Sands II (1856–1889), himself the son of banker Samuel Stevens Sands.  Anne, the daughter of banker Oliver Harriman (1829–1904) and Laura (née Low) Harriman (1834–1901), had two sons by Sands, George Winthrop Sands (1885–1908), and Samuel Stevens Sands III (1884–1913).  She was also the sister of Oliver Harriman, Jr., J. Borden Harriman, and Herbert M. Harriman.  Her first cousin was E. H. Harriman.  Together, Lewis and Anne were the parents of two daughters:

 Barbara Cairncross Rutherfurd (1895–1939), who married Cyril Hatch, son of Charles Henry Hatch, in 1916. They had once child, Rutherfurd L. Hatch (d. 1947), before divorcing in 1920. In 1924, she married Winfield Jesse Nicholls, a fellow follower of Oom the Omnipotent.  After having two children, Guy Winfield Nicholls and Margaret Mary Nicholls, they divorced in 1930.
 Margaret Stuyvesant Rutherfurd (1891–1976), who first married Ogden Livingston Mills (1884–1937), Secretary of the Treasury. They divorced in 1919.  In 1922, she married Sir Paul Henry Dukes (1889–1967). They divorced in 1929 and, later that same year, she married Prince Charles Michel Joachim Napoléon (1892–1973), son of Joachim, 5th Prince Murat.  They also divorced and in 1939, she married Frederick Leybourne Sprague.

Rutherfurd died on January 5, 1901, at Davos Platz in Graubünden, Switzerland. He was buried in the family plot at Tranquility Cemetery in Tranquility, New Jersey near his family's estate known as "Tranquility".

After his death, his widow remarried to William Kissam Vanderbilt (1849–1920).  Vanderbilt, who had previously been married to Alva Smith, was the son of William Henry Vanderbilt and was the father of Consuelo Vanderbilt, William Kissam Vanderbilt II, and Harold Stirling Vanderbilt.  They remained married until his death in 1920.  Anne died on April 20, 1940.

References

Bibliography

External links
 

1859 births
1901 deaths
People from New York City
Lewis Morris Jr.
Lewis Morris Rutherfurd Jr.
Lewis Morris Rutherfurd Jr.
Lewis Morris Rutherfurd Jr.
American socialites
Columbia College (New York) alumni